Donald Jeffret Schwartz (born February 24, 1956) is a former American football defensive back in the National Football League (NFL) who played for the New Orleans Saints and St. Louis Cardinals. He played college football at Washington State University.

References 

1956 births
Living people
Sportspeople from Billings, Montana
Players of American football from Montana
American football defensive backs
Washington State Cougars football players
New Orleans Saints players
St. Louis Cardinals (football) players